Sara Suzanne Brown is an American actress who is best known for her appearances in softcore erotic films between 1991 and 1995. She made her film debut in a small role as a background dancer in The Last Boy Scout (1991). Among her films include Secret Games 2: The Escort (1993), Mirror Images 2 (1993), Test Tube Teens from the Year 2000 (1993), and Killer Looks (1994).

Filmography

Film

Television

References

External links

American film actresses
American television actresses
Living people
Year of birth missing (living people)